List of wilderness areas designated by U.S. state and tribal governments. Eight states had designated wilderness programs in 2002 while some other states had designated wildernesses. In 2002, the 9 state programs had 74 wilderness areas with a total protected area of 2,668,903 acres (10,800.7 km²). Florida had 10 wilderness areas until their authorizing legislation was repealed in 1989.

For federally designated wildernesses, see List of U.S. wilderness areas. There are also privately owned areas called wildernesses like the Nature Conservancy's 12,000 acre (49 km²) Disney Wilderness Preserve in Florida.

State wildernesses

Alaska
3 areas in 2002, total area 922,700 acres (3734 km²)

California
10 areas in 2002, total area 466,320 acres (1887 km²)
Boney Mountains State Wilderness Area
Mount San Jacinto State Wilderness Area
Henry W. Coe State Wilderness (unofficially called the Orestimba Wilderness)
Santa Rosa Mountains State Wilderness Area
Sinkyone Wilderness State Park
West Waddell Creek State Wilderness Area

Hawaii
Alakai Wilderness Preserve - 9,000 acres (36 km²)

Maine
Allagash Wilderness Waterway

Maryland
29 areas in 2009, total area 43,773 acres (177 km²)

Michigan
1 area in 2002, total area 40,808 acres (165 km²)

Minnesota
state land within the Boundary Waters Canoe Area Wilderness

Missouri
11 areas in 2002, total area 22,993 acres (93 km²)

New York
21 areas in 2002, total area 1,170,312 acres (4,736 km²)

Adirondack Park:

Blue Ridge Wilderness Area - 45,736 acres (185.09 km²)
Dix Mountain Wilderness Area - 45,208 acres (182.95 km²)
Five Ponds Wilderness Area - 117,978 acres (447.440 km²)
Giant Mountain Wilderness Area - 22,768 acres (92.139 km²)
Ha-De-Ron-Dah Wilderness Area - 26,528 acres (107.36 km²)
High Peaks Wilderness Area - 192,685 acres (779.769 km²) (part of High Peaks Wilderness Complex - 226,435 acres (916.74 km²))
Hoffman Notch Wilderness Area - 36,231 acres (146.62 km²)
Jay Mountain Wilderness Area - 7,100 acres (28.73 km²)
McKenzie Mountain Wilderness Area - 37,616 acres (152.23 km²)
Pepperbox Wilderness Area - 22,560 acres (91.300 km²)
Pharaoh Lake Wilderness Area - 45,883 acres (185.68 km²)
Pigeon Lake Wilderness Area - 50,100 acres (202.75 km²)
Saint Regis Canoe Area - 18,231 acres (73.778 km²)
Sentinel Range Wilderness Area - 23,252 acres (94.098 km²)
Siamese Ponds Wilderness Area - 112,524 acres (455.368 km²)
Silver Lake Wilderness Area - 105,270 acres (426.013 km²)
West Canada Lake Wilderness Area - 156,695 acres (634.122 km²)
William C. Whitney Wilderness Area - 20,500 acres (83 km²)

Catskill Park:

Slide Mountain Wilderness Area 47,500 acres (190 km²)
Big Indian-Beaverkill Wilderness Area 33,000 acres (132 km²)
Indian Head Wilderness Area 16,800 acres (67.2 km²)
West Kill Wilderness Area 19,250 acres (77 km²)

''(A proposed revision to the Catskill State Land Master Plan would upgrade two other management units in the Catskills from wild forest to wilderness status and transfer some land currently considered wild forest to existing wilderness areas)

South Carolina
Mountain Bridge Wilderness

Tennessee
Bridgestone/Firestone Centennial Wilderness - 10,000 acres (40 km²)

Wisconsin
1 area in 2002, total area 6,358 acres (2.6 km² )

Tribal wildernesses

Flathead Indian Reservation (Montana)
Mission Mountains Tribal Wilderness

Great Lakes Indian Fish & Wildlife Commission
consisting of 11 Ojibwa tribes: Bay Mills Indian Community, Keweenaw Bay Indian Community and Lac Vieux Desert band in Michigan; Bad River, Lac Courte Oreilles, Lac du Flambeau, Sokaogon Chippewa Community, Red Cliff and St. Croix bands in Wisconsin; and Fond du Lac and Mille Lacs bands in Minnesota. 

in Chequamegon-Nicolet National Forest, Wisconsin
Blackjack Springs
Headwaters
Porcupine Lake
Rainbow
Whisker Lake
 in Ottawa National Forest, Michigan
McCormick
Sturgeon River Gorge
Sylvania
 in Hiawatha National Forest, Michigan
Big Island Lake
Delirium
Horseshoe Bay
Mackinac
Rock River Canyon
Round Island
in Huron-Manistee National Forest, Michigan
Nordhouse Dunes

External links

2002 survey of state wilderness areas

Wilderness, State and Tribal
Wilderness areas State and Tribal
Wilderness Areas
 Wilderness